Malus or Malos was a town of ancient Galatia, inhabited during Roman and Byzantine times. It was the site of the martyrdom of Theodotus of Ancyra.

Its site is located near Kalecik, in Asiatic Turkey.

References

Populated places in ancient Galatia
Former populated places in Turkey
Roman towns and cities in Turkey
Populated places of the Byzantine Empire
History of Ankara Province